Kneeslappers is the fourth studio album by rock band Huffamoose. It was released digitally in 2004.

Track list

2004 albums
Huffamoose albums